Staša Košarac (born 19 March 1975) is a Bosnian Serb politician serving as Minister of Foreign Trade and Economic Relations since December 2019. He was previously a member of both the national House of Peoples and House of Representatives.

Košarac is a member of the Alliance of Independent Social Democrats.

Early life
Košarac was born on 19 March 1975 to Bosnian Serb parents Milorad and Zoranka in Sarajevo, where he finished elementary and then high school Đuro Pucar Stari in Vogošća. In 2014, he graduated from the Faculty of Business and Industrial Management in Belgrade.

Political career
Košarac is a member of the Alliance of Independent Social Democrats, and got his first public position when he was 25 years old as a councilor in the Municipal Assembly of Višegrad. In 2004, he got elected to the National Assembly of Republika Srpska. In 2011, he became a member of the national House of Peoples and was, later on, Chairman of the House of Peoples. In the 2014 general election, Košarac was elected to a parliamentary seat in the national House of Representatives.

In January 2010, he became the head of the Team for Coordination of War Crimes Investigation and Search for Missing Persons of Republika Srpska by the decision of the Government of Republika Srpska.

On 23 December 2019, Košarac was appointed as Minister of Foreign Trade and Economic Relations in the national government of Zoran Tegeltija. He stayed as minister in the government of Borjana Krišto as well.

Perosnal life
Košarac lives in Istočno Sarajevo with his wife Sanja and their three children. On 28 November 2020, it was confirmed that he tested positive for COVID-19, amid its pandemic in Bosnia and Herzegovina.

On 7 December 2020, Košarac's wife Sanja accused him of threatening and cheating on her.

References

External links
Staša Košarac at vijeceministara.gov.ba

1975 births
Living people
Politicians from Sarajevo
Serbs of Bosnia and Herzegovina
Alliance of Independent Social Democrats politicians
Government ministers of Bosnia and Herzegovina